Wei Minzhe (born 26 November 1998) is a Chinese professional footballer who plays as a goalkeeper for Chinese Super League club Shenzhen F.C..

Early life

Born in Dalian, Liaoning, Minzhe studied at the Dalian Northeast Road Primary School. He moved to Japan with his parents at the age of 11, and trained with the youth team of Chiba Ichibara Club.

Career

Minzhe played well for Chiba Ichibara U18s, helping them to be promoted to the Kogennomiya Cup National Group. After that, he played for the Japan University of Circulation and Economics and played well. 

Wei Minzhe made his debut for Shenzhen against Wuhan Three Towns F.C. on November 26 2022. He ended the 2022 Chinese Super League season on two appearances.

Style of play

Wei is known for his height, standing at 1.98 m tall.

References

External links

Living people
1998 births
Association football goalkeepers
Chinese footballers